The Unity Party (UP) is a political party in Liberia that was started in 1984 by Edward B. Kesselly, also its first standard bearer. Officially founded at Buchanan in Grand Bassa County, the party was established on 27 July 1985. The Unity Party participated in the first elections after the 1980 coup, running against President Samuel Doe in October 1985. The party has remained active in Liberian politics since and was, until 2017, the ruling party.

In the elections held on 19 July 1997, the UP presidential candidate Ellen Johnson Sirleaf won 9.58% of the vote. The party won 7 of 64 seats in the House of Representatives and 3 of 26 in the Senate. While international observers deemed the polls administratively free and transparent, they noted that it had taken place in an atmosphere of intimidation because most voters believed that former rebel leader and National Patriotic Party (NPP) candidate Charles Taylor would return to war if defeated.

Unity Party candidate Sirleaf won the 2005 presidential elections, defeating George Weah of the Congress for Democratic Change (CDC) in a run-off. The party also won 3 seats in the Senate and 8 in the House of Representatives. The merger of the Liberia Unification Party and the Liberian Action Party into the Unity Party on 1 April 2009 substantially increased its representation in the Legislature.

The party lost in the run-off of the 2017 presidential and representatives elections to ex-footballer, George Weah. On 13 January 2018 the party expelled President Ellen Johnson Sirleaf from the party for campaigning for and with Weah against her own Vice President, Joseph Boakai, who was campaigning on the party ticket.

Party Leadership 

Former Vice President Boakai remains the Standard Bearer of the Party and the leading opposition contender for the upcoming 2023 Presidential elections. Hon. Boakai was instrumental in the formation of the Collaborating Political Parties (CPP) that brought together the four largest opposition political parties, the All Liberian Party (ALP), the Alternative National Congress (ANC), the Liberty Party (LP), and the Unity Party (UP) to form an opposition bloc against Pres. Weah's Coalition for Democratic Change (CDC).

The Party is constitutionally led by its chairman, Amin Modad, elected in September 2020 with over 62% majority after defeating veteran politician Sen. Conmany Wesseh and others. Elected along with other core executives, Amin Modad brings in the credibility and a pro-business experience that is much needed to revive the Party and positively influence the national political discourse. He has always been a trailblazer; with over 20 years of public and private sectors experience, Amin Modad is one of Liberia’s few trade development experts and postwar entrepreneurial success stories.

He has served as Liberia’s first representative to the World Trade Organization, headed the multi-donor funded Enhanced Integrated Framework Program in Liberia, and served as Sr. Policy Advisor to the government of Liberia on trade and investment. He has played a key role in Liberia’s post-conflict recovery especially with regards establishing key economic policies and Liberia’s integration into the multilateral trading system.

Electoral history

Presidential elections

House of Representatives elections

Senate elections

References 

https://thenewdawnliberia.com/new-faces-in-up/

External links
Weah cries foul in Liberia's presidential play-off, Sam Knight and agencies, The Sunday Times Online, November 10, 2005



Political parties in Liberia
Political parties established in 1984
Buchanan, Liberia